

Ernst Friedrich Biehler (7 June 1903 – 26 May 1997) was a German general in the Wehrmacht during World War II. He was also a recipient of the Knight's Cross of the Iron Cross.

Awards and decorations
 Wehrmacht Long Service Award 3rd Class (2 October 1936)

 2nd Class (2 August 1940)
 1st Class (20 April 1942)
 German Cross in Gold on 10 July 1943 as Oberstleutnant im Generalstab in the 24. Infanterie-Division
 Knight's Cross of the Iron Cross on 9 May 1945 as Generalmajor and Fortress commander of Frankfurt/Oder

Notes

References

Citations

Bibliography

 
 
 
 

1903 births
1997 deaths
Military personnel from Ulm
People from the Kingdom of Württemberg
Major generals of the German Army (Wehrmacht)
Recipients of the Gold German Cross
Recipients of the Knight's Cross of the Iron Cross
German prisoners of war in World War II held by the Soviet Union